George Parkin (20 August 1903 – 1971) was an English professional footballer who played as a wing half.

References

1903 births
1971 deaths
People from Hunslet
English footballers
Association football defenders
Halifax Town A.F.C. players
Burnley F.C. players
Chester City F.C. players
West Ham United F.C. players
Torquay United F.C. players
Workington A.F.C. players
English Football League players
Sportspeople from Yorkshire